Brazil is a live album by Australian band Men at Work, released in 1998. This album was recorded at a live show at Olympia music venue in Brazil, hence the title. It was first released there as Brazil '96, but for the international release, the year was removed and a new studio recording, "The Longest Night", was added.

Reception

In their retrospective review, AllMusic wrote that: "The new members sound almost identical to the originals, and with a stellar set list composed almost entirely of classic material, it's nearly impossible to hear the difference between the Men at Work lineups of 1996 and 1983."

Track listing

Notes:
 All songs recorded live during Men at Work's tour of Brazil in May '96, except "The Longest Night" which was recorded in Secret Garden Studio (Melbourne) in March '98.

Personnel
Tony Floyd – drums on "The Longest Night"
Stephen Hadley – bass, backing vocals
Greg Ham – flute, guitar, harmonica, keyboards, soprano saxophone, tenor saxophone, vocoder, lead vocal on "Helpless Automaton", backing vocals
Colin Hay – guitar, lead vocals (except on "Helpless Automaton")
Simon Hosford – guitar, backing vocals
John Watson – drums (except on "The Longest Night")

Production
Producers: Greg Ham, Colin Hay
Engineers: David Dale, Greg Ham
Mixing: David Dale, Michael Letho
Editing: Greg Ham, Joe Privitelli
Programming: Greg Ham
Arranger: Toots Wostry
Coordination: Greg Ham
Photography: Greg Ham, Ana Hernandez, Isamu Sawa, Lupco Veljanovski 
Art direction: Steve Hunt
Design: Steve Hunt
Concept: Greg Ham

References

Men at Work live albums
1998 live albums
Sony Records live albums